is a Japanese actress and model. She made her film debut as Shiori Tsuda in Shunji Iwai's 2001 film All About Lily Chou-Chou. She subsequently portrayed Tetsuko Arisugawa in Hana and Alice (2004), also directed by Iwai, Kimiko Tanigawa in the hula dancing film Hula Girls and Hagumi Hanamoto in the 2006 live-action adaptation of the Honey and Clover manga series.

She has won numerous awards for her performances on screen, including the Japan Academy Prize and Kinema Junpo Awards for best supporting actress in 2007 for Hula Girls and Rookie of the Year for continued performances in the field of Films in Media and Fine Arts by the Ministry of Education, Culture, Sports, Science and Technology of Japan in 2009.

Biography

Early career
Yu Aoi made her stage debut as Polly in the 1999 rendition of Annie, followed by her appearance as a regular on TV Tokyo's Oha Suta (The Super Kids Station) in 2000. A year later, she debuted in Shunji Iwai's All About Lily Chou-Chou playing Shiori Tsuda alongside Hayato Ichihara, Shugo Oshinari, Miwako Ichikawa, and Ayumi Ito. Aoi would later work in Ao to Shiro de Mizuiro and Gaichu with friend Aoi Miyazaki. With her first roles on the small and big screen came TV commercials and endorsements for Sony, Yamaha, DoCoMo, Toshiba and Coca-Cola.

In 2003, commemorating the 30th anniversary of Kit Kat in Japan, Shunji Iwai shot a series of short films starring Yu Aoi and Anne Suzuki, which later was expanded into the feature film called Hana & Alice, which earned Aoi the Best Actress award at the Japanese Professional Movie Award.

2005–2007
In 2005, Aoi played her first lead on the big screen in Letters from Kanai Nirai, which was sold in Korea with the alternate title of Aoi Yu's Letter due to her popularity. She also had supporting roles in the Satoshi Miki film Turtles Swim Faster than Expected starring Juri Ueno, and Yamato with Shido Nakamura and Kenichi Matsuyama. This supporting role would earn her one of her double-nomination as Best Supporting Actress at the 2007 Japanese Academy Award. She won against herself for her work as Kimiko Tanikawa in the Japanese hit Hula Girls, which was sent to the Academy Awards as the Japanese official selection that year.

To this date, her role as the hula dancing girl from small town Iwaki remains her most successful role yet, earning her a dozen awards as Best Actress and Best Supporting Actress, alongside her other smaller roles that year as Hagu in Honey & Clover, and Kana Sato in the Shunji-Iwai-produced and Nirai-Kanai-directed Rainbow Song. Aoi also lent her voice to play Shiro in the animated film Tekkon Kinkreet, the adaptation to the Taiyō Matsumoto manga, Black and White, directed by Michael Arias.

During these years, she made commercials for Nintendo, Canon, Shiseido Cosmetics, Shueisha Publishing, Kirin Beverage and continued endorsing DoCoMo. Aoi also released two photobooks with Yoko Takahashi as photographer, and distributed by Rockin'on: Travel Sand in 2005 and Dandelion in 2007.

In 2007, she participated in the live-action adaptation of the manga series Mushishi alongside Joe Odagiri, as well as WOWOW's Don't Laugh at My Romance, Welcome to the Quiet Room with Yuki Uchida, and going back to the stage to play Desdemona in a rendition of Shakespeare's Othello. For these last two roles, Aoi lost 7 kg for her role as eating disorder patient, Miki.

2008–present

Aoi began 2008 with the release of Don't Laugh at My Romance, which earned her a nomination as Best Supporting Actress at the Asian Film Awards 2009. She appeared in the experimental drama Camouflage (aka. Aoi Yu x 4 Lies), in which she collaborated with four different directors exploring the theme of lies. The series lasted for 12 episodes, and included work with Ryō Kase, Yoichi Nukumizu, Shoko Ikezu, Nobuhiro Yamashita, and Yuki Tanada.

A couple of months later, NTV signed Aoi to play her first TV leading role as Handa Sen in the live-action adaptation of Shota Kikuchi's manga series Osen, which aired until the end of June with ten episodes.

Next, Aoi released One Million Yen Girl written and directed by Camouflage director Yuki Tanada, and also released by WOWOW. This was her latest leading film role since Nirai Kanai in 2005. She briefly participated in the Japanese World-War-II-jury-themed film Best Wishes for Tomorrow, as well as the international Tokyo! - a three-short-film collection by Michel Gondry, Leos Carax, and Bong Joon Ho.

In 2009, The Ministry of Education, Culture, Sports, Science and Technology of Japan named Yu Aoi Rookie of the Year in the field of Films in Media and Fine Arts, citing her work in her film debut in All About Lily Chou Chou, until her work in One Million Yen Girl. Later that year, Aoi provided the voice of Ikechan in the film Ikechan and Me, a live-action adaptation of the picture book of the same name by Rieko Saibara, as well as playing supporting roles in Honokaa Boy and Yoji Yamada's Ototo. The following year Aoi starred in Ryūichi Hiroki's 2010 film The Lightning Tree. She later appeared in Vampire, Rurouni Kenshin, and Kiyoshi Kurosawa's 2012 television drama Penance.

Aoi married comedian Ryota Yamasato on June 3, 2019. On February 10, 2022, they announced that she was pregnant with their first child and due in the summer. On August 10, 2022, Yamasato revealed that Aoi had given birth to their daughter.

Filmography

Movies

Television

Stage
Zipang Punk: Goemon Rock III (2014), Silver Cat Eyes

Awards and nominations

References

External links

 
 
 

1985 births
Living people
People from Kasuga, Fukuoka
Japanese film actresses
Japanese stage actresses
Japanese television actresses
20th-century Japanese actresses
21st-century Japanese actresses
Best Actress Asian Film Award winners